Stephen Anderson Nichols (born 20 February 1947 in Salt Lake City, Utah) is an American engineer who is best known as a car designer for many Formula One teams from the mid-1980s until .

Profile

Nichols graduated from the University of Utah in 1972. He began his career as a development engineer at Hercules Aerospace in 1973. In mid-1980 he moved to motorsport and joined McLaren in Formula One. In  he became head car designer in McLaren following the departure of John Barnard to Ferrari.

His first car, the McLaren MP4/3 powered by the turbocharged TAG-Porsche V6 engine, carried Alain Prost to three victories in 1987, the last of which being the 1987 Portuguese Grand Prix where Prost scored his 28th win, passing Jackie Stewart's record of 27 that had stood since . McLaren's second team driver Stefan Johansson, scored five podium finishes during the season. At the end of the season, the MP4/3 had given McLaren second place behind Williams in the Constructors' Championship.

Nichols' second car was the highly successful McLaren MP4/4, powered by a turbocharged Honda V6. The MP4/4, driven by Ayrton Senna and Alain Prost, almost completely dominated the 1988 season with 15 race victories from 16 races, as well as 15 pole positions. The only race the MP4/4 didn't win was the Italian Grand Prix which was won by Gerhard Berger's Ferrari. Berger also claimed the only non-McLaren pole of the year at the British Grand Prix. McLaren won the 1988 Constructors' Championship by a record 134 points from Ferrari, having wrapped up the title in Round 11 in Belgium. Senna and Prost also finished the Drivers' Championship in first and second place, giving the talented Brazilian his first World Championship.

Murray has disputed this in an interview with Motor Sport: "This thing about Steve Nichols being chief designer is the biggest load of rubbish you've ever heard. The MP4/4 was not designed by Steve Nichols, I can promise you that."

Prost won five races and was a serious contender for the world title until a controversial collision triggered by Ayrton Senna put both drivers out of the race at the Japanese Grand Prix. Nichols stayed at Ferrari until December 1991, and later joined Sauber to help Peter Sauber move into Formula One. In  he moved to Jordan as chief designer; later in  he was back at McLaren as a technical consultant.

In  he joined Jaguar Racing as technical director. Although his success gave Jaguar their first podium in Monaco, Nichols left Jaguar in early 2002; he has not worked in Formula One since.

In retirement, Nichols works as a freelance design and technical consultant, based in the United Kingdom; he is also an amateur racing driver, racing a Datsun 260ZX in historic racing events and a Van Diemen RF82 in Historic Formula Ford 2000. In 2017, he founded Nichols Cars to market the N1A, a modern road-going interpretation of the McLaren M1A race car; the car is expected to reach production in 2022.

References

External links
Profile at grandprix.com

1947 births
McLaren people
Ferrari people
Living people
People from Salt Lake City
University of Utah alumni
Formula One designers
American expatriates in the United Kingdom